The Dominion is a neighborhood and master-planned community in San Antonio, Texas.
Situated on approximately  within San Antonio's growing northwest side, The Dominion is considered one of the most affluent neighborhoods in the city.

History
The neighborhood now occupies a far-reaching swath of land once owned by Anson Jones, the last president of the Republic of Texas. Around the turn of the century, it was sold to Adolf Topperwein, a world-renowned sharpshooter and member of Central Texas' large German community.

Profile
With a resident population of roughly 3,000 people, the Dominion is home to some of the most expensive plots in the San Antonio area. The average Zillow home value in the neighborhood was estimated to be $910,848 in October 2021, a figure that is greatly enhanced when comparing San Antonio's relatively low cost of housing to other metro areas. Properties frequently go for multi-million dollar figures.

Notable residents
The following people have lived or currently reside within the Dominion:
 "Stone Cold" Steve Austin
 Manu Ginóbili
 John Hagee
 Tommy Lee Jones
 Gregg Popovich
 David Robinson
 George Strait

References

Neighborhoods in San Antonio
Planned communities in the United States